Gustav Erik Larsson (born 20 September 1980) is a Swedish former professional road racing cyclist, who rode professionally between 2001 and 2016 for nine different teams. Larsson specialised as a time trialist, winning the Swedish National Time Trial Championships seven times between 2006 and 2015, and won silver medals at the Beijing Olympics in 2008 and the 2009 World Championships in Mendrisio.

Professional career
On the international scene he represented Team Saxo Bank, and in Sweden he represented Skoghalls CK-Hammarö. Gemla-born Larsson began cycling when he was 14 years and, having shown great talent and dedication, turned pro just 7 years later. Team  was his first employer, and when the team shut down in 2005 he moved on to Team . He rode for one year for Française des Jeux before moving again to the Swedish-Belgian team , which had gained a wild card to the UCI ProTour in 2006. But just as the 2007 season started the team ran into trouble with the Amaury Sport Organisation who made it clear that Unibet.com would not be invited to Paris–Nice or the Tour de France. Other major race organizers followed suit, which resulted in Unibet.com not getting any major invitations. The team shut down shortly thereafter.  showed interest in Larsson, and he rode for them in 2008. After the 2008 season, it was reported that Larsson had signed with Caisse d'Epargne for 2009, but he continued with Team Saxo Bank. Larsson left  at the end of the 2012 season, and joined the new Swiss-based team  team for the 2013 season. Larsson signed for the  team for the 2015 season.

In March 2015 Larsson made an attempt on the hour record at a Revolution meeting at Manchester Velodrome.

Personal life
He resides in Monaco with his wife Veronica Andrèasson, who also competed as a road racing cyclist. The couple own Vélo Monaco, a cycling holiday organisation.

Major results

2001
 1st Stage 4b Grand Prix Guillaume Tell
 2nd Time trial, National Road Championships
2002
 1st  Overall Okolo Slovenska
1st Young rider classification
1st Stage 5 (ITT)
 1st Stage 4 Brandenburg–Rundfahrt
 2nd Time trial, National Road Championships
 2nd Overall Grand Prix Guillaume Tell
1st Stage 5a
 3rd Overall Ringerike GP
1st Stage 1
 4th Time trial, UEC European Under-23 Road Championships
2004
 4th Time trial, UCI Road World Championships
2006
 1st  Time trial, National Road Championships
2007
 National Road Championships
1st  Time trial
3rd Road race
 3rd Overall Eneco Tour
 3rd Duo Normand (with Víctor Hugo Peña)
 5th Overall Tour Down Under
 6th Chrono des Nations
 7th Overall Tour de Luxembourg
 8th Overall Deutschland Tour
2008
 2nd  Time trial, Olympic Games
 2nd Time trial, National Road Championships
 2nd Overall Critérium International
 4th Overall Danmark Rundt
1st Stage 5 (ITT)
 5th Time trial, UCI Road World Championships
 5th Overall Tour of California
 5th Overall Sachsen Tour
 6th Overall Tirreno–Adriatico
2009
 1st Overall Tour du Poitou Charentes et de la Vienne
1st Stage 3 (ITT)
 2nd  Time trial, UCI Road World Championships
 2nd Overall Tour of Missouri
 7th Overall Tour de Luxembourg
 10th Japan Cup
2010
 National Road Championships
1st  Time trial
2nd Road race
 1st  Overall Tour du Limousin
1st Stage 2 (ITT)
 1st Stage 21 (ITT) Giro d'Italia
 1st Stage 1 (ITT) Vuelta a la Comunidad de Madrid
 4th Chrono des Nations
 7th Overall Vuelta a Andalucía
 10th Time trial, UCI Road World Championships
2011
 1st  Time trial, National Road Championships
 2nd Chrono des Nations
2012
 1st  Time trial, National Road Championships
 1st Stage 1 (ITT) Paris–Nice
 8th Chrono des Nations
2013
 1st  Time trial, National Road Championships
 2nd Chrono des Nations
 5th Overall Tour du Poitou-Charentes
 8th Overall Tour Méditerranéen
 9th Time trial, UCI Road World Championships
2014
 4th Overall Tour of Norway
2015
 1st  Time trial, National Road Championships
 9th Overall Bayern–Rundfahrt
 9th Overall Tour of Norway
2016
 3rd Time trial, National Road Championships

Grand Tour general classification results timeline

References

External links

Swedish male cyclists
Olympic cyclists of Sweden
Cyclists at the 2004 Summer Olympics
Cyclists at the 2008 Summer Olympics
Cyclists at the 2012 Summer Olympics
Olympic silver medalists for Sweden
Swedish expatriate sportspeople in Italy
Swedish expatriate sportspeople in Monaco
1980 births
Living people
Olympic medalists in cycling
Swedish Giro d'Italia stage winners
People from Växjö Municipality
Medalists at the 2008 Summer Olympics
Sportspeople from Kronoberg County